"96 Tears" is a song recorded by the American garage rock band ? and the Mysterians in 1966 (see 1966 in music). In October of that year, it was #1 on the Billboard Hot 100 in the U.S. and on the RPM 100 in Canada. Billboard ranked the record as the #5 song for 1966. It was ranked #213 on the Rolling Stone list of the 500 Greatest Songs of All Time in 2010. On November 11, 1966, the single was certified as gold by the RIAA.

Background
The song was written by Question Mark (Rudy Martinez) in 1962 in his manager's living room, and was recorded in Bay City, Michigan. At first, Question Mark had to insist that "96 Tears" be the A-side over "Midnight Hour". Once the issue was settled, the band recorded the single for the small Pa-Go-Go label, owned by Lilly Gonzalez. She backed the band financially, and allowed access to her personal studio in her basement. When it began doing well locally, the band took a recording to Bob Dell, the radio director in Flint, Michigan. The song became the most requested, and wider radio play spread into Canada, where it was picked up by Cameo Records for national distribution.

Various reports have suggested that Question Mark first wrote the song under the title "Too Many Teardrops" and then "69 Tears", but then changed the title, fearing that radio stations wouldn't play the song.  However, Question Mark denied this in an interview, stating that the number 96 has a deep philosophical meaning for him.

Known for its signature organ licks and bare-bones lyrics, "96 Tears" is recognized as one of the first garage band hits, and has even been given credit for starting the punk rock movement.

The song appeared on the band's album 96 Tears. The follow-up song, "I Need Somebody", peaked at #22 later that year, but no other U.S. Top 40 singles followed.

Chart history

Weekly charts
? and the Mysterians

The Stranglers

Year-end charts

Personnel
Rudy Martinez (Question Mark) – vocals
Frank Rodriguez – Vox Continental organ
Bobby Balderrama – lead guitar
Frank Lugo – bass guitar
Eddie Serrato – drums

Other versions
A Spanish version of the song was also recorded by ? And the Mysterians
Big Maybelle released a version of the song as a single in 1967 that reached #23 on the US R&B chart and #96 on the US pop chart.
Aretha Franklin released a version of the song on her second Atlantic studio album "Aretha Arrives" in 1967.
Thelma Houston released a version of the song as a single in 1981 that reached #22 on the US dance chart and #76 on the US R&B chart.
Garland Jeffreys released a version of the song as a single and track from his album "Escape Artist" in 1981 that reached #5 on the US rock chart, #66 on the US pop chart, and #75 on the US dance chart.
The Stranglers released a version that reached #17 in the UK Singles Chart in 1990.

See also
 List of 1960s one-hit wonders in the United States

References

External links
 Lyrics of this song
 
 

1966 songs
1966 debut singles
1966 singles
1981 singles
1990 singles
? and the Mysterians songs
The Stranglers songs
Eddie and the Hot Rods songs
Thelma Houston songs
Billboard Hot 100 number-one singles
Cashbox number-one singles
RPM Top Singles number-one singles
Cameo-Parkway Records singles
RCA Records singles
Epic Records singles